Sasneham Sumithra is a 2004 Malayalam film by Ambadi Krishnan starring Suresh Gopi. It is an uncredited film adaptation of the 1938 novel "Rebecca" written by Daphne du Maurier. The critically acclaimed romantic psychological thriller film Rebecca by Alfred Hitchcock was based on this novel.

Plot
Balan is a Navy officer. He falls in love and later marries Sumitra. Later he resigns and settles down with business, but Sumitra's father, and cousin do not like Balan. Under mysterious situations Sumitra commits suicide.

Balan once again marries Warrier's only daughter Seetha. But when the well in Balan's estate gets cleaned, a skeleton is found inside. The forensic reports confirms the skeleton is Sumitra's and that she was murdered by a gun shot to the head. A police officer Inspector Muhammed Kutty investigates the case. He concludes that Sumithra committed suicide as she was suffering from a terminal illness. 
But Balan and his brother-in-law Shekhar who conducted a parallel investigation on Sumithra's death finds the real murderer of Sumithra and he is arrested by Inspector Muhammed.

Cast
Suresh Gopi as Balachandran 
Siddique as C.I Muhammad Kutty
Renjini Krishnan  as Seetha 
Lalu Alex as Sekhar
Sai Kumar as Kumar 
Bindu Panicker as Meenakshi
Poornima Anand
Kalasala Babu as Kurup
Gayathri as Devaki

Soundtrack 
The music was composed by Ouseppachan and lyrics were written by Shibu Chakravarthy.

References

External links
 

2000s Malayalam-language films
Indian remakes of American films
2004 films
Films scored by Ouseppachan